Nando (born 3 July 1966 in Brazil) is a Brazilian retired footballer.

References

Living people
Brazilian footballers
1966 births
Hamburger SV players
Association football forwards